Justice Hawley may refer to:

Cyrus M. Hawley, associate justice of the Territorial Utah Supreme Court
Thomas Porter Hawley, associate justice of the Supreme Court of Nevada